Gone So Long can refer to:

 A track on the 2016 PAWS album No Grace
 A track on the 2011 Breathe Carolina album Hell Is What You Make It
 A track on the 1999 Sophie Zelmani album Time to Kill
 A track from the Blue Pills album Lady in Gold